Xochiquetzal Candelaria (born June 13, 1973) is an American poet from San Juan Bautista, California. Her work has been showcased in The New England Review and The Nation and she has also received multiple fellowships through the National Endowment for the Arts as well as other organizations.

Education 

Candelaria earned her Bachelor's degree in rhetoric from the University of California, Berkeley and a Master's degree in English and American Literature from New York University.

Career 
Her debut poetry collection Empire was published in 2011 by the University of Arizona Press. Candelaria is currently a professor at the City College of San Francisco where she has taught English since 2008.

Published works 

 Empire, University of Arizona Press, 2011. 
 "On the Teaching of Philip Levine" In Coming Close: Forty Essays on Philip Levine, edited by Mari L'Esperance and Tomas Q. Morin, University of Iowa Press, 2013. 
 Selections in Other Musics: New Latina Poetry (Chicana and Chicano Visions of the Américas Series), anthology, edited by Cynthia Cruz, University of Oklahoma Press, 2019. 
 Selections in The Poetry of Capital: Voices from Twenty-First-Century America, anthology, edited by Benjamin S. Grossberg and Clare Rossini, University of Wisconsin Press, 2020. 
 Selections in Four Way Review, Issue 23, Four Way Books, 2022.

References 

21st-century American poets
Poets from California
1973 births
Living people
City College of San Francisco faculty
UC Berkeley College of Letters and Science alumni
New York University alumni
People from San Juan Bautista, California
21st-century American women writers
American women poets
Hispanic and Latino American poets